Greg Werckman (born in 1964) is a businessman and musician. He is the co-founder of Ipecac Recordings. Ipecac was launched in 1999 with Faith No More frontman Mike Patton. Patton and Werckman's friendship was cultured through a shared love of basketball and video games. Werckman also served as DUH's primary vocalist and lyricist and recorded The Unholy Handjob with the band in 1995.

Career highlights
Spent eight years managing Jello Biafra's label, Alternative Tentacles.
Co-founded Ipecac Recordings with Mike Patton

References

External links

 Ipecac Recordings
 Werckman on Jekyll and Hyde, 106FM Jerusalem

1965 births
Living people
DUH (band) members